The White Darkness  is the fourth non-fiction book by American journalist David Grann. The book was released on October 30, 2018 by Doubleday. This is a short opus dedicated to the adventures of British explorer Henry Worsley.

Theme
The book centers on the expeditions and adventures by British explorer and British Army officer Henry Worsley who traveled to the gravesite of Ernest Shackleton, a polar explorer himself. To reach the grave, Worsley traveled to the far shores of South Georgia Island in the southern Atlantic Ocean. In the following years, he traveled even farther.

In 2008, he started his first journey across Antarctica, leading an expedition to pioneer a route through the Transantarctic Mountains, reaching a point  from the South Pole. The expedition commemorated the centenary of Shackleton's Nimrod Expedition. Worsley returned to the Antarctic in 2011, leading a team of six in retracing Roald Amundsen's successful  journey in 1912 to the South Pole, marking its centenary. In completing the route, he became the first person to have successfully undertaken the routes taken by Shackleton, Robert Falcon Scott and Amundsen.

In 2015, Worsley decided to start a new expedition. Worsley arrived at the starting point, Berkner Island, on 13 November 2015 with the aim of completing his journey in 80 days. He covered  in 69 days, and had only  to go. However, he had to spend days 70 and 71 in his tent, suffering from exhaustion and severe dehydration. Eventually, he radioed for help and was airlifted to Punta Arenas, Chile. He was diagnosed with bacterial peritonitis. On 24 January 2016, he died of organ failure following surgery at the Clinica Magallanes in Punta Arenas. He was 55 years old. Worsley was posthumously awarded the Polar Medal for his exploration of the Antarctic.

Reception
Michael Magras of the Star Tribune noted,
 

Julian Glover of the Evening Standard commented, 
 
David Holahan of the Christian Science Monitor mentioned, "For all of its page-turning appeal, the book studiously avoids psychological speculation on what compels its subject to repeatedly to place himself in harm’s way. Grann doesn’t openly address the possibility of inner demons, but he drops hints here and there."

TV limited series 
In April 2022 Apple TV+ announced that The White Darkness would be developed into a new limited series starring Tom Hiddleston. The series will be developed by Soo Hugh and co-produced by Apple Studios and UCP.

References

External links

2018 non-fiction books
21st-century history books
Doubleday (publisher) books